Pennsylvania's 26th congressional district was one of Pennsylvania's districts of the United States House of Representatives.

List of representatives

References

 
 
 Congressional Biographical Directory of the United States 1774–present

26
Former congressional districts of the United States
Constituencies established in 1875
1875 establishments in Pennsylvania
Constituencies disestablished in 1973
1973 disestablishments in Pennsylvania